Cholestasis facies are a type of facies considered a symptom of Alagille syndrome.  However it appears not to be specific but "a general feature of congenital intrahepatic cholestatic liver disease".

References

Symptoms